Quartino may refer to:

 Quartino, Ticino, a small village in Magadino, Switzerland
 E-flat clarinet or

People with the surname
 José N. Quartino, designer of the Club de Pescadores in Buenos Aires, Argentina